Discovery Real Time was a British television channel owned by Discovery Networks UK focused on educational and learning content.

History
It was originally launched on 9 March 1992 as The Learning Channel, United Kingdom's version of the American television network of the same name as a daytime service from Intelsat, mostly aimed at cable systems, and was initially broadcast on the Discovery Channel's frequency.

When the Discovery Channel launched on Astra satellite on 22 July 1993, it didn't initially carry TLC in the daytime. From 5 September 1994, it shared a transponder on the Astra 1C satellite with the Discovery Channel, which started its broadcasts at 4.00pm. It was later rebranded as Discovery Home & Leisure on 3 April 1997, but full day broadcasting started with the launch of Sky Digital in October 1998. On 22 May 2001, a timeshift channel called Discovery Home & Leisure +1 was launched.

From 1997 to 2002, the logo was a blue oblong containing a window, however this was changed to a red background featuring a stylised 'H&L', staying like this until 2005.

The channel was relaunched as Discovery Real Time on 7 May 2005 in the British market. The channel aimed at complementing the female-skewed Discovery Home & Health (which itself replaced Discovery Health). A sister channel called Discovery Real Time Extra was launched on 22 August 2005. On 20 March 2009, it was replaced with Discovery Shed.

Discovery Real Time is also available in some other regions, including France and Italy. The channel used to be available in Asia since October 2008, and it has become the Indian version of Discovery Turbo.

The channel closed along with Discovery Travel & Living at 6.00am on 30 April 2013, to be replaced by TLC and Investigation Discovery +1. The final signature programme for Discovery Real Time was Bob Ross' The Joy of Painting, given that TLC chasing a completely different demographic than the old version and treating it as a new channel launch rather than a return.

In 2018, the channel launched in South Africa for MultiChoice's DStv on 15 April 2019, as well as StarTimes (channel 161 satellite, channel 158 terrestrial) and in 2020 on Canal+ Afrique (channel 47 and 400).

See also
 List of television channels in the United Kingdom
 Timeline of cable television in the United Kingdom

References

External links
 Discovery Channel UK
 Discovery Real Time on TVARK

Warner Bros. Discovery networks
Real Time
Television channels and stations established in 1992
Television channels and stations disestablished in 2013
Defunct television channels in the United Kingdom
1990s in British television
2000s in British television
2010s in British television
History of television in the United Kingdom